Leonardo de Jesus Geraldo (born 4 August 1985), known as Leonardo Jesus or just Léo, is a Brazilian footballer, usually playing as a wing-back.

Career

Portuguesa
Born in São Paulo state, Leonardo Jesus started his career with Portuguesa de Desportos. After made his national league debut at 2004 Campeonato Brasileiro Série B, he signed a new -year contract with club in August 2005. In 2005 Campeonato Brasileiro Série B, he was the regular start of the team, played 18 out of 21 games and 11 out of 12 games in champion playoffs. He missed twice due to suspension (that season he was cautioned 11 times and every 3 cautions suspend once) and rested in round 21. That season Lusa finished as the 4th. In 2006 Campeonato Brasileiro Série B, he played 23 league matches and most notably missed 9 matches from round 11 to 19 and the last 4 matches of the league. He was cautioned 3 times that season but no suspension. He enjoyed his best season in 2007, winning Campeonato Paulista Série A2, played 35 times in 2007 Campeonato Brasileiro Série B, scored 2 goals and just suspended once. That season he was cautioned 5 times in Serie B. Portuguesa finished as the third and promoted to 2008 Campeonato Brasileiro Série A. He also earned an international cap coached by Dunga on 9 December.

He did not play in 2008 Campeonato Paulista as he was busy in transfer talks.

Olympiacos
Leonardo Jesus was signed by Olympiacos in January 2008. for a reported €2 million paid to Lusa to buy its 65% economic rights of the player. The rest was owned by a third-party owner José Riva. In July 2011 his contract was terminated.

Internacional
In June 2010, he was loaned back to Brazil in 1-year deal. However, he suffered from injury and did not play any match for the first team in the 2011 season.

PAOK
On 9 September 2011 Leonardo Jesus signed one-year contract with PAOK. The club keeps the right to break this contract in January 2012, if the player won't meet its expectations.

International career
The left-back was set to be in Brazil's 2008 Olympic football squad and gained his first national cap in a pre-olympic friendly, against Brazil League Best XI. Brazil Olympic eventually lost 0–3. He was then dropped from the preliminary squad.

Career statistics

Note:
State Leagues were marked as league cup
1 No stats. available for 2004 to 2006 Campeonato Paulista Série A1 and Campeonato Paulista Série A2.
2 3 games in 2010 qualification playoffs for European competitions
3 Not registered in 2010 and 2011 Copa Libertadores
4 See note 1 and 2

Honours 
 Greek Cup: 2008, 2009
 Greek Super League: 2007–2008, 2008–2009
 Campeonato Paulista Série A2: 2007

References

External links
 
  
 
  

Brazilian footballers
Campeonato Brasileiro Série A players
Campeonato Brasileiro Série B players
Super League Greece players
Associação Portuguesa de Desportos players
Olympiacos F.C. players
Sport Club Internacional players
Grêmio Barueri Futebol players
Atlético Clube Goianiense players
Brazilian expatriate footballers
Brazilian expatriate sportspeople in Greece
Expatriate footballers in Greece
Association football fullbacks
People from Carapicuíba
1985 births
Living people
Footballers from São Paulo (state)